Downtown Wichita is the central business district of Wichita, Kansas, United States. The political and financial hub of the city, it is home to several of the area's major landmarks and event venues including the Epic Center, Century II Performing Arts & Convention Center, Intrust Bank Arena, and the Old Town entertainment district.

History

In 1872, the community of Wichita opened a toll bridge on Douglas Avenue to Delano across the Arkansas River, and the Atchison, Topeka and Santa Fe Railway opened a line through the city, triggering an economic boom. Local industries in banking, meat packing, and real estate emerged. A large warehouse district developed along the rail lines south from Central Avenue. By the late 1870s, the intersection of Douglas Avenue and Main Street had become the downtown hub of local commerce.

Continued economic growth through the 1880s spurred further downtown development, including the completion of the Wichita City Building in 1892.  The building housed all city government offices, both the police and fire departments, and the city's first public library. During the subsequent decades, a number of manufacturers constructed plants downtown, including the Coleman Company in 1901.

The Forum, Wichita's convention center and primary event venue, opened downtown in 1911. It was built on the site of city co-founder Dutch Bill Greiffenstein's homestead. The Orpheum Theatre opened downtown in 1922 and became a popular venue on the vaudeville circuit.

By the 1960s, sections of downtown had entered a period of decline. To commemorate the centennial of Wichita's founding, the city razed The Forum and in its place built the Century II Performing Arts & Convention Center which opened in 1969. The city government relocated to a new City Hall in 1975. In 1981, the former City Building reopened as the Wichita-Sedgwick County Historical Museum. In 1987, construction finished downtown on the Epic Center office tower, the tallest building in the city and in the state of Kansas.

In 1989, the city initiated a redevelopment plan to revitalize Downtown Wichita. Among the plan's results was the redevelopment of the old warehouse district into Old Town, an entertainment district home to numerous restaurants and night clubs. The city implemented further development plans, including the construction of Intrust Bank Arena, a new multi-purpose indoor arena which opened in 2010.

Geography
It mainly consists of the area between Murdock Street to the north, U.S. Route 54 (Kellogg) to the south, the Arkansas River to the west, and Washington Street to the east. Portions of Downtown overlap with the Midtown neighborhood to the north, Delano across the river to the west, and Riverside to the northwest. In addition, it borders the McAdams neighborhood to the northeast, The Hyde (also called Kellogg School) to the east, and South Central to the south.

Economy
As of 2018, several national and regional companies maintain offices in Downtown Wichita.  The headquarters of agricultural conglomerate Cargill’s Protein Group is located there as are the central offices of IT company High Touch Technologies, shipping firm King of Freight, and area commercial banks Emprise Bank, Fidelity Bank, and Intrust Bank. Other firms with offices downtown include telecommunications conglomerate AT&T, life insurance company New York Life, engineering consultancy PEC, home security firm Protection One, and regional electric utility Westar Energy.

Once the largest bank in Kansas, Bank IV was headquartered in downtown Wichita from its foundation in 1887 to its acquisition in 1995 by Boatman's Bank. Outdoor equipment maker Coleman, founded in Wichita in 1901, operated a factory downtown from 1929 to 1990 and then a factory outlet store and museum until 2018.

Several national hotel chains have locations downtown. The Hyatt Regency Wichita and the historic Broadview Hotel, operated by Drury Hotels, are near the Century II Convention Center.  Other hotels include the Ambassador Hotel, Hotel at Old Town, and Hotel at WaterWalk as well as a Courtyard by Marriott, Fairfield Inn by Marriott, and Wyndham Garden Motel.

Government

The portion of Downtown north of Douglas Avenue and west of Washington Street is in City Council District 6. The rest of Downtown is in City Council District 1. Wichita City Hall is located downtown at the corner of Main Street and Central Avenue.

Downtown Wichita is in the 29th district of the Kansas Senate and the 103rd district of the Kansas House of Representatives.

The Wichita U.S. Courthouse, one of the three courthouses of the United States District Court for the District of Kansas, is located downtown at the corner of 3rd Street and North Market Street.

Media
The offices of The Wichita Eagle, the primary newspaper published in the city, and the Wichita Business Journal are located downtown in Old Town. The Roman Catholic Diocese of Wichita publishes its official newspaper, Catholic Advance, from its offices in downtown Wichita.

KMUW, the NPR member station in Wichita, broadcasts from studios in Old Town.

Parks and recreation
The city government's Park and Recreation Department manages several parks and recreational spaces downtown.  A. Price Woodard Park occupies  on the east bank of the Arkansas River immediately south of Douglas Avenue. Named after a former mayor of the city, it includes an amphitheater, a lighted decorative fountain, and a number of bronze sculptures. Chester I. Lewis Reflection Square Park is a small,  "pocket park" on Douglas Avenue with water fountains and bronze sculptures. Named after a local civil rights leader, the park is located on the site where the Dockum Drug Store sit-in took place in 1958. Finlay Ross Park is a  mini-park east of Century II consisting of landscaped, multi-level pools, fountains, and waterfalls.

The  Heritage Square Park, located on East William Street, includes a gazebo and rock fountain pool. The Mayor's Pine Grove is a  space at Water Street and 2nd Street developed in 1978 to help beautify the area. Veterans Memorial Park occupies  on Greenway Boulevard and hosts 16 memorials to U.S. military veterans and their families.

Culture

Points of interest
 Century II Performing Arts & Convention Center
 Commerce Street Art District
 Douglas Design District
 Epic Center
 Great Plains Transportation Museum
 Intrust Bank Arena
 Kansas Sports Hall of Fame
 Museum of World Treasures
 Old Town
 Orpheum Theatre
 Wichita-Sedgwick County Historical Museum

Transportation

Broadway Street is the main north–south street through downtown; Douglas Avenue is the main east–west street.  Other arterial roads include:  Central Avenue, which runs east–west along the central business district's northern edge; Washington Avenue, which runs north–south along its eastern edge; and Kellogg Avenue (U.S. Route 54 and U.S. Route 400), which runs along its southern edge. The base point for the numbering of all postal addresses in the city and Sedgwick County is the intersection of Douglas Avenue and Main Street.  Douglas is the divider between north and south; Main Street is the divider between east and west.

The Wichita Transit Center, Wichita Transit’s main bus terminal, is located downtown at South Topeka Street and East William Street.  Most of Wichita Transit’s bus routes service the central business district including the 11 through 17 and 21 through 29 routes.  All four routes of the free Q-Line trolley also service downtown.

BNSF Railway and Union Pacific Railroad operate freight rail lines which run north-south through downtown Wichita, parallel to Santa Fe Avenue. There has been no passenger rail service to Wichita since 1979. Union Station, the former passenger rail station in the city, has since been repurposed as an office building.

Gallery

References

External links
  Old Town Wichita
  Wichita Downtown Development Corporation

Geography of Wichita, Kansas
Neighborhoods in Kansas
Wichita